Aristides Fraga Lima (b. July 2, 1923 - 1996?)  is a popular Brazilian writer who was born in town of Paripiranga in the state of Bahia.  He has a degree in Languages and Law.  After graduating from the Federal University of Bahia, he became a teacher of multiple languages.

Bibliography 
These books are part of the Coleção Vaga-Lume (Firefly Collection) of juvenile fiction published by Ática:

 A serra dos dois meninos (Mountain of the two young boys)
 Os Pequenos Jangadeiros (The Little Rafters)
 Perigos no Mar (Dangers at Sea)

References

1923 births
1996 deaths
Brazilian male writers